The 2012 Auto Club 400 was a NASCAR Sprint Cup Series stock car race held on March 25 at Auto Club Speedway in Fontana, California. Shortened to 129 laps because of rain showers, it was the fifth race of the 2012 Sprint Cup Series season. The race was won by Tony Stewart for the Stewart-Haas Racing team. Kyle Busch finished second, and Dale Earnhardt Jr., who started fourteenth, clinched third.

Report

Background
Auto Club Speedway is one of six superspeedways to hold NASCAR races. The track's turns are banked at fourteen degrees, while the front stretch, the location of the finish line, is banked at eleven degrees. The back stretch has 3 degrees of banking. The racetrack has seats for 92,100 spectators.

Before the race, Greg Biffle was leading the Drivers' Championship with 157 points, nine points ahead of Kevin Harvick in second and twelve ahead of Matt Kenseth. Martin Truex Jr. followed fourth with 139 points, two ahead of Denny Hamlin and Dale Earnhardt Jr. in fifth and sixth. Tony Stewart, with 130, was in the seventh position ahead of Clint Bowyer and Joey Logano. Paul Menard rounded out the first ten positions with 123 points. In the Manufacturers' Championship, Ford was first with 25 points, one ahead of Chevrolet and four ahead of Toyota. Dodge was in the fourth positions with 18 points. Kevin Harvick was the race's defending winner from 2011.

Practice and qualifying
Three practice sessions were held before the Sunday race—one on Friday and two on Saturday. The first session lasted 90 minutes. The Saturday morning session lasted 50 minutes, and the final practice session lasted 60 minutes. During the first practice session, Bowyer was quickest with a time of 38.896, ahead of Mark Martin and Kasey Kahne in second and third. Brad Keselowski followed in the fourth position, ahead of Hamlin in fifth.

During qualifying, forty-six cars were entered, but only forty-three were able to race because of NASCAR's qualifying procedure. Hamlin clinched is tenth career pole position, with a time of 38.626. After his qualifying run, Hamlin commented, "We're four weeks in, and we've had two good weeks and two bad weeks. There's light at the end of the tunnel. I feel like this weekend we've got a little bit more speed than we had in Vegas. We're getting better, and we've got some good stuff coming with our team. We're obviously heading in the right direction." He was joined on the front row of the grid by Kyle Busch. Martin qualified third, Biffle took fourth, and Kahne started fifth. The three drivers that did not qualify were Robby Gordon, Joe Nemechek and Timmy Hill.

Hamlin was quickest in the second practice session with a time of 38.706 seconds. Kenseth and Ryan Newman followed in second and third, ahead of Tony Stewart in the fourth position. Kevin Harvick was fifth, less than five-hundredths of a second quicker than Kyle Busch. Keselowski, Carl Edwards, Jimmie Johnson, and Kahne rounded out the first ten positions. During the third and final practice session, Hamlin, with a fastest time of 39.553, remained quickest. Jeff Gordon and Bowyer followed in second and third with times of 39.700 and 39.732 seconds. Jamie McMurray was fourth fastest, ahead of Kyle Busch and Johnson. Harvick, Kenseth, Martin Truex Jr., and Stewart completed the first ten positions during the session.

Race
The race, the fifth in the season, began at 3:12 p.m. EDT and was televised live in the United States on Fox. The conditions on the grid were dry before the race while cloudy skies were expected. Jeff Hamilton, of Motor Racing Outreach, began pre-race ceremonies, by giving the invocation. Next, Night Ranger performed the national anthem, and the trio of Sean Hayes, Chris Diamantopoulos, Will Sass (from the film The Three Stooges) gave the command for drivers to start their engines.

Pole position winner, Hamlin maintained the lead throughout the first lap, but was overtaken by Kyle Busch on the following lap. As the weather became worse for racing conditions, many teams adjusted their cars during the first set of green flag pit stops. On the 85th lap, Stewart claimed the lead from Kyle Busch. Shortly after, Stewart moved back into the lead ahead of Hamlin and Kyle Busch after pitting.

The race ran 250 miles without incident, with the first caution on Lap 125 for rain. During pit stops, Stewart refused to pit, while Hamlin in the second position and a few others did. Also during the caution, Johnson, who had been in the top-ten for most of the race, began having problems with a potential oil leak, causing the smoke to run out of under the car. Afterward, the caution flag turned to a red flag, stalling the race because of the rain shower. Afterward, NASCAR decided the end the race, making Stewart the winner. Kyle Busch finished second, ahead of Dale Earnhardt Jr., Harvick and Edwards. Biffle, Ryan Newman, Martin Truex Jr., Kurt Busch, and Johnson rounded out the first ten positions.

It was the first time a NASCAR race in the premiership had gone without an incident-related safety car since the October 2002 Talladega race.

Results

Qualifying

Race results

Standings after the race

Drivers' championship standings

Manufacturers' championship standings

Note: Only the top five positions are included for the driver standings.

References

Auto Club 400
Auto Club 400
Auto Club 400
NASCAR races at Auto Club Speedway